Vuelo may refer to:

Vuelo (album), an album by Kudai
"Vuelo" (song), a song by Ricky Martin